In politics, an opt-out is when one level of government can decline or refuse to be part of a program designed by another, usually higher, level of government.

The term is used in both Canada and the European Union, where it has roughly the same meaning.  In both cases it refers to lower levels of government choosing not to participate in a program implemented by a higher level.

Canada

In Canadian usage opting out refers to a province's right to withdraw from federal programs.  Debate often revolves around the question of compensation for provinces that choose to opt out.

European Union

Opt-outs in the European Union refer to areas of EU law that certain member states have not implemented.

References

Political terminology